The 1985 Copa de la Liga was the third year of Copa de la Liga. The competition started on April 11, 1985 and concluded on June 15, 1985. Due to time constraints, saturation and club pressure, the Copa de la Liga only lasted four years from its introduction in 1982, being cancelled in 1986.

Format
The Copa de la Liga was played by 18 teams of 1984-85 La Liga and the 4 winners of 1984 Copa de la Liga of Segunda División,  Segunda División B and Tercera División. All rounds were played over two legs. The team that had the higher aggregate score over the two legs progressed to the next round. The 1984-85 Copa del Rey winner was exempt until the quarter-finals and the 1984-85 Copa del Rey quarter-final losers were exempt until the second round.

La Liga

Other teams
CD Castellón, winner of 1984 Copa de la Liga of Segunda División.
Gimnàstic de Tarragona, winner of 1984 Copa de la Liga of Segunda División B group I.
CD Antequerano, winner of 1984 Copa de la Liga of Segunda División B group II.
CD Tudelano, winner of 1984 Copa de la Liga of Tercera División.

First round
First leg: 11 April 1985. Second leg: 17, 18, 21 and 24 May 1985.

|}
Bye: Athletic Bilbao, Atlético Madrid, FC Barcelona, Real Betis, Real Madrid, Real Zaragoza, Real Sociedad and Sporting Gijon.

Second round
First leg: 1, 4 and 5 May 1985. Second leg: 7 and 9 May 1985.

|}
Bye: Real Madrid.

Quarter-finals
First leg: 11 and 12 May 1985. Second leg: 16 and 19 May 1985.

|}

Semi-finals
First leg: 30 May 1985. Second leg: 2 June 1985.

|}

Final

First leg

Second leg

References

External links
RSSSF

Copa de la Liga
1984–85 in Spanish football cups